Jesús Mendoza Aguirre (born 23 February 1977) is a Spanish retired footballer who played as a left back, currently a manager.

He spent the vast majority of his 18-year senior career with Xerez, competing in all three major levels of Spanish football and appearing in 459 competitive matches. He started working as a manager in 2014, with the same club.

Playing career
Mendoza was born in Jerez de la Frontera, Province of Cádiz. After starting professionally with lowly Racing Club Portuense, he moved in 1999 to hometown side Xerez CD. In seven of the following ten seasons he never appeared in less than 32 games, being instrumental in the Andalusians' promotions to the second division (2001) and La Liga (2009).

In the 2009–10 campaign, Mendoza could only play 12 league matches as the team were immediately relegated from the top flight. He made his debut in the competition on 30 August 2009, in a 2–0 away loss against RCD Mallorca.

In late 2010, the 33-year-old Mendoza renewed his contract with his main club for a further season, whilst accepting to take a pay cut. On 3 July 2013, after dropping two tiers at once, he left the Estadio Municipal de Chapín and joined Atlético Sanluqueño CF of division three, retiring in January of the following year.

Coaching career
Mendoza returned to former club Xerez on 7 July 2014, being appointed manager of the first team after a spell with their youths when he was still an active player.

References

External links
 
 
 

1977 births
Living people
Footballers from Jerez de la Frontera
Spanish footballers
Association football defenders
La Liga players
Segunda División players
Segunda División B players
Tercera División players
Cádiz CF B players
Cádiz CF players
Xerez CD footballers
Atlético Sanluqueño CF players
Spanish football managers
Tercera División managers
Xerez CD managers